The DP-65 (98U) is a Russian special compact 55 mm ten-barreled remotely-controlled naval grenade launcher system based on MRG-1 seven-barrel grenade launcher. It also has a manual control mode.

Description
The DP-65 (98U) is a Russian special compact 55 mm ten-barreled remotely-controlled naval grenade launcher system based on MRG-1 seven-barrel grenade launcher. It also has a manual control mode.

DP-65 uses sonar Anapa-ME for underwater target detection. DP-65 high explosive grenades  RG-55M are akin to miniature depth charges equipped with jet engine with an annular stabilizer. 

In 1991, the DP-65 automated, small size, remotely-controlled Rocket Grenade Launcher system was developed and adopted by the Russian Navy.

DP-65 can be installed directly on watercraft and on the coast.

Designed to protect ships, waterworks, offshore platforms and other important marine and coastal facilities from combat divers, frogmen, and saboteurs. The grenades are believed to produce casualties to divers within 16 meters of the explosion. They are employed by Grachonok-class anti-saboteur ships.

Users

See also
DP-64
MRG-1

External links
V.A.Degtyarev Plant website
DP-65 grenade launcher
Russia’s Naval Grenade Launchers: Shiver Everyone’s Timbers!

References

Grenade launchers
Weapons of Russia